A partial solar eclipse occurred on July 9, 1888 during winter.  A solar eclipse occurs when the Moon passes between Earth and the Sun, thereby totally or partly obscuring the image of the Sun for a viewer on Earth. A partial solar eclipse occurs in the polar regions of the Earth when the center of the Moon's shadow misses the Earth.

It was the second of three partial eclipses that took place that year, the last was on February 11 and the next was on August 7 in the Northern Hemisphere  It was the last four of solar saros 115, the next was on July 21, 1906 and the last was on August 12, 1942.

Description
The eclipse took place in much of the south of the Indian Ocean and included the smaller islands of Kergueren, New Amsterdam and a very small portion of two parts of Northern Antarctica by the ocean at the area of the 75th meridian east as other parts of Antarctica had a 24-hour night. The rim of the eclipse was near Prince Edward Islands, it was north of the Tropic of Capricorn and was about 40–50 miles (60–80 km) southwest of the southwesternmost portion of Western Australia.  The greatest eclipse was less than a mile (or a kilometer) inland from the Atlantic in Antarctica south of the Antarctic Circle at 67.6 S and 78.8 E at 6:30 UTC (11:30 AM local time).

The eclipse started at sunrise off the coast of Africa and ended at sunset off the coasts of Australia.

It showed up to below 50% obscuration of the sun. The center of the Moon's shadow was missed by about 1,400  km above the area (67.6 S) south of the Antarctic Circle.

See also 
 List of solar eclipses in the 19th century

References

External links 
 Google interactive maps
 Solar eclipse data

1888 07
Solar eclipse of 07 09
1888 07
July 1888 events